The Wellingborough School Ground is a cricket ground which was used by Northamptonshire County Cricket Club in  43 First-class matches for 45 years between 1946 and 1991, and 17 List A games between 1970 and 1991. It is now used predominantly for Women's County Twenty20 Cricket.  The Thatched Pavilion which adjoins the ground features, as the last step an incoming batsman takes on the way to the wicket, a paving stone from W. G. Grace's home in Bristol.  Murray Witham, a geography teacher at the school, rescued the stone from Grace's home when it was being demolished in the 1930s and brought it to the school.

Records

First Class
 Highest team total: 523-8d by Yorkshire against Northamptonshire, 1949
 Lowest team total: 62 by Middlesex v Northamptonshire, 1977
 Highest individual score: 269* by L Hutton for Yorkshire against Northamptonshire, 1949
 Highest partnership: 208* by D Brookes and N Oldfield for the First wicket in Northamptonshires innings against Yorkshire, 1949
 Best bowling in an innings: 7-46 by FH Tyson for Northamptonshire against Derbyshire, 1956

One Day
 Highest team total: 272 by Somerset against Northamptonshire, 1986
 Highest individual score: 175* by IT Botham for Somerset against Northamptonshire, 1986
 Highest partnership: 202 by W Larkins and P Willey for the First wicket in Northamptonshires innings against Leicestershire, 1979
 Best bowling in an innings: 5-31 by FD Stephenson for Nottinghamshire against Northamptonshire, 1991

See also
Wellingborough School
Northamptonshire County Cricket Club

References

External links
Wellingborough School Ground on Cricinfo
Wellingborough School Ground on CricketArchive

Cricket grounds in Northamptonshire
Sports venues completed in 1946
Wellingborough School
Wellingborough